Edwards Run is a  tributary stream of the Cacapon River, belonging to the Potomac River and Chesapeake Bay watersheds.  The stream is located in Hampshire County in the U.S. state of West Virginia's Eastern Panhandle. Edwards Run is named for Joseph Edwards and his family, whose plantation encompassed most of the stream's course. George Washington surveyed his property in the late 1740s. It is a major source of various species of elodea.

Headwaters and course
The source of Edwards Run lies between Cooper (2,028 ft) and Schaffenaker (1,493 ft) Mountains, southwest of Capon Bridge. Edwards Run flows northeast under the Northwestern Turnpike (U.S. Route 50) continuing to follow the western side of Schaffenaker Mountain. Edwards Run then flows through the Edwards Run Wildlife Management Area where it is dammed creating the  lake, Edwards Pond. The stream flows under Cold Stream Road (County Route 15) and into the Cacapon River south of Cold Stream.

Fishing

Edwards Pond provides fishing for bass, sunfish, bluegill and channel catfish. Edwards Run and Pond are also stocked with trout February through March and in October.

See also
List of West Virginia rivers

References

External links

Rivers of Hampshire County, West Virginia
Rivers of West Virginia
Tributaries of the Potomac River